The Wollaston Islands are a group of islands in Chile south of Navarino Island and north of Cape Horn and east of the Hoste Island. The islands are Grevy, Bayly, Wollaston and Freycinet, as well as the islets Dédalo, Surgidero, Diana, Otarie, Middle and Adriana.  The islands are part of Cabo de Hornos National Park.

Geography
The islands are located north of the Hermite Islands and separated from them by the Franklin Channel. The islets Terhalten, Sesambre, Evout and Barnevelt are located easterly and are not considered part of the Wollaston islands. North of the islands is Nassau Bay.

History
The islands were named between 1829 and 1831 by the British naval officer Henry Foster, after the English scientist William Hyde Wollaston.  The indigenous name in the Yahgan language was Yachkusin, "place of islands". The Yahgan lived throughout central Tierra del Fuego to Cape Horn. Numerous place names reflect British interests in the 19th century.

In the later 19th century, Wollaston was the site of an English South American Mission Society to the Yahgan. (See Martin Gusinde Anthropological Museum#Stirling Pavilion).

After Chile and Argentina achieved independence, they asserted their claims in this area. The Boundary Treaty of 1881 between Chile and Argentina ceded the islands south of the Beagle Channel to Chile, but in 1904 Argentina claimed the islands. In 1978 Argentina started the Operation Soberanía to occupy the islands around Cape Horn and then, in a second phase, either to stop or continue hostilities according to the Chilean reaction. The invasion was halted after a few hours. In 1982, after the invasion of the Falklands, the Argentine government planned also the invasion of the islands south of the Beagle Channel.

See also
 List of islands of Chile
 Hermite Islands, the islands south of Wollaston
 Diego Ramírez Islands, the southernmost islands of the region

References 

 
Archipelagoes of Chile
Archipelagoes of the Pacific Ocean
Uninhabited islands of Chile
Islands of Tierra del Fuego